Scurtu Mare is a commune in Teleorman County, Muntenia, Romania. It is composed of six villages: Albeni, Drăcești, Negrilești, Scurtu Mare, Scurtu-Slăvești and Valea Poștei.

References

Communes in Teleorman County
Localities in Muntenia